Invasion of Privacy is a 1996 American thriller film directed by Anthony Hickox and starring Johnathon Schaech, Mili Avital and Naomi Campbell.

Cast 
 Mili Avital as Theresa Barnes
 Johnathon Schaech as Josh Taylor
 Naomi Campbell as Cindy Carmichael
 David Keith as Sgt. Rutherford
 Tom Wright as Devereux
 R. G. Armstrong as Mr. Logan
 Charlotte Rampling as Deidre Stiles
 Scott Wilkinson as Doctor Shuman
 Susan Dolan Stevens as Lt. Gibbons

Reception

Soundtrack 
 "I'll never leave you lonely at night" (performed by Eddie Chacon)
 "Welcome to love - Now go home" (performed by Danielle Brisebois)
 Nocturne in B-flat minor, Op. 9, No. 1 (Frédéric Chopin)
 Symphony No. 1 (Wolfgang Amadeus Mozart)
 Carmen, "La fleur que tu m'avais jetée..." (Georges Bizet)

References

External links 
 
 
 

Films scored by Angelo Badalamenti
1990s erotic thriller films
American erotic thriller films
Films scored by Anthony Marinelli
Films shot in New Jersey
1990s American films